Serrano is a town of 1,406 inhabitants of the Province of Lecce, in Apulia, southern Italy. It is a frazione (subdivision) of Carpignano Salentino comune and is 13 km from Otranto and 29 from Lecce province.

References

Gallery

Frazioni of the Province of Lecce
Localities of Salento